Donald Nicholson may refer to:

Donald W. Nicholson (1888–1968), American politician
Donald Nicholson (Canadian politician) (1850–1932), Canadian politician
Donald Nicholson (biochemist) (1916–2012), English biochemist